During the 1931–32 English football season, Brentford competed in the Football League Third Division South. Despite leading the division for two months in mid-season, the Bees fell away to finish 5th.

Season summary
Brentford manager Harry Curtis' additions to his squad for the 1931–32 Third Division South season were minor – backup goalkeeper Dave Smith, amateur half back Jackie Gibbons and forwards George Cook, George Robson and Bert Stephens. The team had a very strong first half of the season, rising to the top of the table by 5 December 1931 and staying there until 13 February 1932, when a run of just five defeats in 31 matches in all competitions came to an end. Billy Lane kept up his prolific goalscoring form from the previous two seasons, scoring 20 goals in a 27 match spell, with Jackie Foster, Bill Berry and Jackie Gibbons also supporting with regular goals.

As in the previous two seasons, Brentford's suffered a slump in the second half of the campaign, losing 9 of 14 matches between mid-February and late April to drop to as low as 9th, though two wins from the final two matches of the season elevated the side to a 5th-place finish. Brentford had also reached the fourth round of the FA Cup for the second successive season, exiting the competition after a heavy 6–1 defeat at the hands of top-flight Manchester City at Maine Road. It had been rumoured in April 1932 that manager Curtis had tendered his resignation, but chairman Louis P. Simon recognised his good work over the previous six years and persuaded him to stay. A run of four successive home Football League draws during the season equalled the club record, while Billy Lane's seventh and final Brentford hattrick (scored versus Coventry City on 12 September 1931) set a new club record.

Reserve team 

Brentford's reserve team finished as champions of the London Combination for the first time. The team went undefeated at home from 21 November 1931, setting off a run which extended until 4 November 1933. Ralph Allen captained the team and scored a large percentage of the goals.

League table

Results
Brentford's goal tally listed first.

Legend

Football League Third Division South

FA Cup

 Sources: Statto, 11v11, 100 Years of Brentford

Playing squad 
Players' ages are as of the opening day of the 1931–32 season.

 Sources: 100 Years of Brentford, Timeless Bees, Football League Players' Records 1888 to 1939

Coaching staff

Statistics

Appearances and goals

Players listed in italics left the club mid-season.
Source: 100 Years of Brentford

Goalscorers 

Players listed in italics left the club mid-season.
Source: 100 Years of Brentford

Amateur international caps

Management

Summary

Transfers & loans 
Cricketers are not included in this list.

Notes

References 

Brentford F.C. seasons
Brentford